Bethel, Ontario may refer to:
Bethel, Grey County, Ontario
Bethel, Leeds and Grenville United Counties, Ontario
Bethel, Niagara Regional Municipality, Ontario
Bethel, Prince Edward County, Ontario
Bethel, Kawartha Lakes, Ontario